Wat Phnom Airlines was a charter airline based in Siem Reap, Cambodia.

History
Wat Phnom Airlines was founded in 2013 as a result of a rebranding of failed airline TonleSap Airlines. The airline took its maiden flight on 10 July 2013 between Siem Reap in Cambodia and Taoyuan in Taiwan.

The airline ceased operations in 2014.

Destinations
Wat Phnom Airlines served the following destinations:

Fleet
Wat Phnom Airline operated the following aircraft during operations:

The aircraft was later sold to Swiftair, a Spanish airline and converted into a freighter.

References

External links

 (Archive)

Airlines established in 2010
Defunct airlines of Cambodia
Airlines disestablished in 2014
Cambodian companies established in 2010